Amalthina is a genus of moths of the family Yponomeutidae.

Species
Amalthina lacteata - Meyrick, 1914 

Yponomeutidae